Manntis is an American metalcore band.

History
Manntis originally formed in 2000 as a four-piece group. The band gathered mainstream attention in 2004 when they were one of the contestants on MTV's Battle for Ozzfest. Their lead guitarist, Adair Cobley, was picked as the representative for the band on the show. Ultimately, Manntis finished in third place (behind Curse Your Name and eventual winners A Dozen Furies).

On April 1, 2005, it was announced that the band signed a worldwide deal with Century Media Records. Their debut album Sleep in Your Grave was released on June 28, 2005. The tracks "Axe of Redemption" and "Weathered Souls" were released as singles, with music videos accompanying each.

The band announced that their next album, tentatively titled Master of Ceremonies, was due for a 2007 release, but that did not happen. Despite being mostly inactive since the announced hiatus, the band created a Facebook page in 2013, and continue to play a small number of charity shows and one-off events around California.

Members

Current
 Jake Sirokman – vocals
 Jimmie Sanders – drums
 Adair Cobley – lead guitar, backing vocals
 Dan "DeeRock" Racadio – rhythm guitar, backing vocals
 Clint Gregory – bass

Former
 Gus Rios – drums
 Jeremy Swanson – guitar
 Joshua Feathers – drums
 Andre Morales – drums
 Marco Gomez - vocals

Discography
Sleep in Your Grave (2005)
Master of Ceremonies (unreleased)

References

External links
 Official site
 

Heavy metal musical groups from California
Metalcore musical groups from California
Musical groups established in 2000
Century Media Records artists